Wakonda Beach State Airport  is a public airport located three miles (4.8 km) southwest of Waldport in Lincoln County, Oregon, USA.  The airport is located a short walk from Beachside State Recreation Site.

External links

Airports in Lincoln County, Oregon